Beauharnois-Salaberry is a regional county municipality in the Montérégie region of Quebec, Canada. Its seat is Beauharnois.

History 
The RCM was formed by combining the historic counties of Beauharnois and Châteauguay.

Subdivisions 
There are 7 subdivisions within the RCM:

Cities & Towns (2)
 Beauharnois
 Salaberry-de-Valleyfield

Municipalities (4)
 Saint-Étienne-de-Beauharnois
 Saint-Stanislas-de-Kostka
 Saint-Urbain-Premier
 Sainte-Martine

Parishes (1)
 Saint-Louis-de-Gonzague

Demographics

Language

Transportation

Access routes 
Highways and numbered routes that run through the municipality, including external routes that start or finish at the county border:

 Autoroutes
 
 

 Principal Highways
 
 

 Secondary Highways
 
 
 
 
 

 External Routes
 None

Attractions 
 Beauharnois Canal
 Beauharnois Hydroelectric Generating Station (Melocheville)
 Deux-Rives Ecomuseum (Salaberry-de-Valleyfield)
 Howick Airport (Saint-Étienne-de-Beauharnois)
 Pointe-du-Bruisson Archaeological Park (Melocheville)
 Valleyfield Airport (Saint-Stanislas-de-Kostka)

Protected areas:
 Îles-de-Paix National Fauna Reserve
 Îles-de-Saint-Timothée Regional Park

See also 
 List of regional county municipalities and equivalent territories in Quebec

References

External links 
 

 
Census divisions of Quebec